Chloroprednisone acetate is a synthetic glucocorticoid corticosteroid and a corticosteroid ester.  It is the 21-acetate ester of chloroprednisone.

References

Corticosteroid esters
Glucocorticoids